Bank of Ayudhya Public Company Limited, branded and commonly referred to as Krungsri (sometimes stylized as krungsri), is the fifth largest bank in Thailand in terms of assets, loans, and deposits. Through its branches and service outlets are in Thailand and abroad, the company provides banking, consumer finance, investment, asset management, and other financial products and services to small and medium enterprises, large corporations and individual customers.

History 

The Bank of Ayudhya was established on 27 January 1945 in Phra Nakhon Si Ayutthaya Province, the old capital of Thailand. The bank opened its doors on April 1, 1945, with registered capital of one million baht.

In 1970, the bank's head office was relocated to Ploenchit Road, coinciding with the bank's celebration of the royal appointment (garuda) emblem, granted by the king to the bank on 15 May 1970. The bank was listed on the Stock Exchange of Thailand on 26 September 1977, trading symbol, "BAY".

On 3 January 2007, Krungsri and GE Capital became strategic partners. GE Capital and Ratanarak Group were major shareholders with a 33 percent and a 25 percent stake in BAY, respectively.

In September 2012, GE announced the sale of 7.6 percent of its stake in Krungsri via a number of block trades, reducing their ownership to 25.33 percent.

On 18 December 2013, MUFG Bank, Ltd., the wholly owned subsidiary of Mitsubishi UFJ Financial Group (MUFG), Japan's largest banking group, replaced GE Capital as the major shareholder of Krungsri.

Name and brand 
After having undergone changes in the late-2000s, including the acquisition of GE Money Thailand, and to reach its goal of becoming one of the top three banks in Thailand, Bank of Ayudhya unified its subsidiaries and rebranded. In 2014, the bank rebranded as "Krungsri" (shortened from กรุงศรีอยุธยา, "capital city/revered city Ayutthaya"), the bank's formal name. In the media, the formal and colloquial names are used interchangeably, while for the bank's own marketing (such as logos, URL, storefronts, ATMs, bank cards and promotional material) "Krungsri" is used.

Distribution network 
 Domestic branches: 695 (658 banking branches and 37 auto-business branches)
 Overseas branches: 3 (Hong Kong, Vientiane, Savannakhet)
 Exchange booths: 95
 ATMs: 6,250
 Krungsri business centers: 83
 Krungsri Exclusive Banking Zones : 29
 Krungsri First-Choice branches and dealers: 112 and 16,689 respectively
 Krungsri Auto Dealers: >7,000
 Micro finance branches: 382

Major developments and acquisitions 
 On 3 January 2007, Bank of Ayudhya (Krungsri) and GE Money, a global consumer financial services firm, became strategic partners.
 On 14 February 2008, Krungsri completed its acquisition of GE Capital Auto Lease Public Company, Ltd. (GECAL). On the transfer date, GECAL recorded 78.01 billion baht in assets and 75.28 billion baht in outstanding loans, resulting in a 17 percent increase in the bank's portfolio on that date. GECAL was later renamed Ayudhya Capital Auto Lease Company Limited (AYCAL).
 On 8 April 2009, Krungsri completed the acquisition of AIG Retail Bank PCL (AIGRB) and AIG Card (Thailand) Company Limited (AIGCC). The value of the transaction was 1.6 billion baht. Krungsri's acquisition of both entities resulted in an increase of 32.8 billion baht in the bank's assets, 21.9 billion baht in loans, 18.6 billion baht in deposits, and approximately 222,000 credit cards.
 On 9 September 2009, Krungsri completed the acquisition of CFG Services Co., Ltd. (CFGS), a subsidiary of American International Group. CFGS, better known as "Srisawad Money on Wheels", is one of Thailand's providers of micro-finance with a presence in the title loan market.
 On 5 November 2009, Krungsri completed the acquisition of GE Capital's consumer finance businesses in Thailand. The acquisition of GEMT accelerated the growth of Krungsri's consumer banking portfolio by increasing its retail lending portfolio from 36 percent to 42 percent of Krungsri's total loans. With the addition of GEMT's current portfolio, Krungsri is the largest card issuer in Thailand with over three million cards in circulation, serving over eight million customers.
 In March 2012, Krungsri completed the acquisition of HSBC Thailand's retail banking businesses, including credit cards, personal loans, mortgages, and deposits with an estimated consideration of 3.6 billion baht. As a result of the transaction, Krugnsri Group's assets grew by roughly 17.5 billion baht or 1.8 percent, increasing retail loans from 45 to 46 percent of total loans.
 On 5 January 2015, the Bank of Tokyo-Mitsubishi UFJ, Ltd. (BTMU) Bangkok Branch was successfully integrated into Krungsri, in accordance with the One Presence Policy of the Bank of Thailand. Krungsri issued 1,281,618,026 ordinary shares to BTMU for the transfer of the business of BTMU Bangkok Branch.
 22 April 2015 Krungsri opened a representative office in Yangon, Myanmar, with an aim to support Krungsri's corporate and SME clients in capturing business opportunities in the country.
 13 September 2016 Krungsri acquired Hattha Kaksekar Limited (HKL), a leading microfinance in Cambodia, with becoming a Krungsri Group subsidiary. 
 27 March 2017 Krungsri set up new subsidiary, Krunsri Finnovate Company Limited, Venture Capital business under the regulatory and investment guideline set up by the Bank of Thailand.
 27 September 2017 Krungsri was recognized as a domestic systemically important bank (D-SIB) by the Bank of Thailand - assessing not only our size but also our interconnectedness and the role Krungsri plays in contributing to financial sector stability and development as well as economic growth for Thailand.

Subsidiaries, associates and joint ventures
Bank of Ayudhya's investments in subsidiaries, associates and joint ventures net as of 31 December 2016 and 2015.

Major shareholders

 As of 9 September 2016

See also

List of banks in Thailand

References

Banks of Thailand
Companies based in Bangkok
Banks established in 1945
Companies listed on the Stock Exchange of Thailand
1945 establishments in Thailand
Thai Royal Warrant holders
Mitsubishi UFJ Financial Group
SET50 Index